KHGI-TV (channel 13) is a television station licensed to Kearney, Nebraska, United States, serving as the ABC affiliate for most of central and western Nebraska and the northern third of Kansas. It is owned by Sinclair Broadcast Group alongside Lincoln-licensed Fox affiliate KFXL-TV (channel 51). KHGI-TV's transmitter is located near Lowell, Nebraska.

Overview
The station is part of the Lincoln–Hastings–Kearney market, but this market has historically had little basis in television reality and is only completely realized on the local satellite feeds. The market does share three television stations, CBS affiliate KOLN (channel 10) in Lincoln (which operates a satellite in Grand Island, KGIN [channel 11]), NBC affiliate KSNB-TV (channel 4) in Superior and Fox affiliate KFXL. However, the market is split for ABC coverage; KHGI/KWNB serves as the ABC affiliate for the western half of the market, while KLKN (channel 8) serves as the network's affiliate for Lincoln and the eastern half of the market. Omaha ABC affiliate KETV also has significant viewership in the eastern part of the market, and remained available on most cable systems in that portion after they dropped other Omaha stations.

KHGI has gained cable coverage on the Lincoln side of the market in recent years, including carriage on channels 2 and 1202 on Charter Spectrum in Lincoln proper as of July 2017. Both KHGI and KLKN are also carried on the Lincoln DirecTV and Dish Network feeds.

History
KHGI signed on December 24, 1953, as KHOL-TV, a CBS and DuMont affiliate based in Holdrege. The station was founded by the Bi-States Co., headed by Holdrege doctor F. Wayne Brewster. In 1954, the station also added secondary affiliations with ABC and NBC; however, KHOL nearly lost CBS that same year, before protests from viewers led the network to sign a two-year renewal of the station's affiliation. Channel 13 would lose NBC a year later in advance of the 1956 launch of KHAS-TV (channel 5, now KNHL). DuMont would end network operations in 1956, and KHOL-TV briefly affiliated with the NTA Film Network. That same year, on February 9, KHOL added a satellite in Hayes Center, KHPL-TV (channel 6).

Bi-States expanded into radio in June 1959 with the launch of KHOL-FM (98.9 FM, now KKPR-FM); in 1961, the company also purchased KRNY (1460 AM, now KXPN). KRNY was sold to Radio Kearney in 1964; the following year, the same company purchased KHOL-FM.

On February 2, 1961, KHOL-TV and KHPL-TV dropped CBS to become full ABC affiliates, a few months before KGIN-TV (channel 11) signed on from Grand Island as a satellite of Lincoln's CBS affiliate, KOLN-TV (channel 10). On December 3, 1964, Bi-States signed on another KHOL satellite, KHQL-TV (channel 8) in Albion. KHTL-TV (channel 4) in Superior followed on October 1, 1965. The four stations began branding as the Nebraska Television Network, or NTN for short; the brand was shortened to NTV in the early 1970s.

The station featured local programming, including The Bobby Mills Show on Saturday evenings from 9:30 until 10 p.m. The Bobby Mills Orchestra was the "house band" and hosted guest artists, though the bulk of the show was dedicated to the band and its soloists, similar to The Lawrence Welk Show. Bobby's sons, Bobby Mills Jr. and Ron, were featured extensively on the program. Taping of the show was done once a month on a Friday night, after KHOL's midnight sign-off. An average of five shows were done per taping, which typically ended at 4 a.m. The show ran during the late 1960s into the early 1970s.

NTV Enterprises acquired the NTV stations in 1974 for $1.9 million. On June 3, the new owners changed the call letters of all the stations: KHOL became KHGI-TV, KHPL became KWNB-TV, KHQL became KCNA-TV and KHTL became KSNB-TV. The new call signs were chosen to reflect the areas served by each station; KHGI stands for "Kearney, Hastings, Grand Island", while KWNB refers to that station's service to western Nebraska.

Joseph Amaturo bought the NTV stations in 1979 in an $8.5 million deal funded by the sale of KQTV in St. Joseph, Missouri. KCNA was split off from NTV on November 1, 1983, to become an independent station under the call letters KBGT-TV; Amaturo Group sold KHGI-TV, KWNB-TV, and KSNB-TV to Gordon Broadcasting for $10 million in 1985; the sale separated the NTV stations from KBGT, which was separately sold a year later to Citadel Communications and became KCAN, a satellite of Sioux City, Iowa's KCAU-TV. Citadel later moved KCAN to Lincoln as a stand-alone station, KLKN.

Gordon Broadcasting planned to sell the NTV stations to Sterling Communications for $11 million in 1989. However, later that year, the stations were placed into receivership; initially overseen by former owner Joseph Amaturo, Joseph Girard was appointed successor receiver in 1991. Under Girard, who operated NTV through Girard Communications, KHGI-TV, KWNB-TV, and KSNB-TV were sold to Fant Broadcasting, owner of WNAL-TV in Gadsden, Alabama, for $2 million in 1993.

On April 1, 1994, Fant took over the operations of Hill Broadcasting Company's KTVG (channel 17), an upstart independent station in Grand Island in the process of joining Fox, under a local marketing agreement (LMA), making it a sister station to the NTV stations. Concurrently with KTVG's primary Fox affiliation, KHGI-TV, KWNB-TV, and KSNB-TV took on a secondary Fox affiliation to carry the network's NFL coverage. In July 1995, Fant announced a deal to sell KHGI, KWNB, and KSNB to Blackstar, LLC, a minority-controlled company in which nonvoting equity interests were held by Fox Television Stations and Silver King Communications, for $13 million; although the deal, which would have seen the NTV stations switch to a full-time Fox affiliation, was approved by the Federal Communications Commission (FCC) on December 15, 1995, Fant cited delays in FCC approval in walking away from the deal in May 1996.

In July 1996, Fant agreed to sell KHGI-TV, KWNB-TV, and KSNB-TV to Pappas Telecasting Companies for $12.75 million. Pappas immediately assumed control of the NTV stations through a local marketing agreement that began on July 1, and that September broke KSNB off from NTV and made it a Fox affiliate as a satellite of KTVG; KHGI and KWNB remained with ABC. In 1997, Pappas sold its right to acquire KSNB to Colins Broadcasting Company for $10 (with Colins paying $333,333 to Fant), as channel 4's signal overlapped with Pappas' Omaha station, KPTM; Pappas also entered into an LMA with Colins to continue operating KSNB. The sales of KHGI and KWNB to Pappas and KSNB to Colins were approved by the FCC on February 17, 1999 and completed on May 24. In 2009, Pappas began moving Fox programming in the market to KFXL-TV (channel 51, which signed on as a Pappas-operated WB affiliate in 2006 and later carried The CW before joining Fox) and the second digital subchannels of KHGI-TV and KWNB-TV; the company subsequently ended the LMAs with KSNB-TV (which, after going dark, was purchased by Gray Television in 2013 and is now an NBC affiliate) and KTVG-TV (which permanently ceased operations). In 2004, KHGI was one of the 65 ABC-affilaited stations who preempted an uninterrupted Veterans Day showing of Saving Private Ryan.

KHGI-CD in North Platte, Nebraska signed on in 1989 as translator station K13VO, becoming WSWS-CA on July 4, 2005 and KHGI-CA on June 12, 2009. The WSWS-CA call sign was unique, as it made it a station with a "W" call sign prefix west of the Mississippi River. This was allowed due to the fact that "WSWS" was the former callsign of then-current Pappas station WLGA in Columbus, Georgia, and the calls were grandfathered to the former K13VO. In 2010, KHGI-CA switched to digital and became KHGI-LD. KHGI-LD is not a true repeater of KHGI-TV in that its digital television broadcast is identified as "KHGI-LD Digital Television" on compatible television receivers and appears as channel 27.1 rather than 13.1. KHGI-LD also does not rebroadcast KFXL on a digital subchannel as North Platte already receives Fox on KIIT-CD. ABC programming on KHGI-LD is carried in high definition. When the analog KHGI-CA license was surrendered on September 1, 2011, KHGI-LD became KHGI-CD, inheriting the analog station's class A status.

As of February 18, 2014, KHGI was the only big three affiliated station owned by Pappas. In August 2015, the liquidating trust for Pappas announced that it was soliciting bids for a bankruptcy auction of the company's Nebraska stations, which took place October 27, 2015. Of the four companies that participated in the auction, Sinclair Broadcast Group emerged as the winning bidder; on November 4, 2015, the company announced that it had agreed to acquire KHGI-TV, KWNB-TV, and KFXL-TV for $31.25 million. The sale was completed on May 1, 2016.

News operation
KHGI-TV currently broadcasts a total of 27 hours of local newscasts each week (with five hours on weekdays and one hour each on Saturdays and Sundays). In May 2006, NTV became one of the first television stations in the country to generate a community based news site. Community Correspondent allows registered users to post stories, photos, and videos to the site. Many of the postings are used on air in different stories.

In May 2013, NTV added a weekly agricultural news program, called NTV's Grow, which was the station's first regular broadcast in HD. The station began broadcasting its news in HD on September 5, 2013.

Former on-air staff
 Marg Helgenberger – weather anchor (1980–1981; now an actress, best known for playing Catherine Willows on CSI)

Technical information

KHGI-TV and KWNB-TV/LD subchannels
The stations' digital signals are multiplexed:

KHGI-CD subchannel
KHGI-CD only carries the main ABC NTV subchannel:

Analog-to-digital conversion
Both stations shut down their analog signal on February 17, 2009, the original target date in which full-power television stations in the United States were to transition from analog to digital broadcasts under federal mandate (which was later pushed back to June 12, 2009). The station's digital channel allocations post-transition are as follows:
 KHGI-TV shut down its analog signal, over VHF channel 13; the station's digital signal relocated from its pre-transition UHF channel 36 to VHF channel 13.
 KWNB-TV shut down its analog signal, over VHF channel 6; the station's digital signal relocated from its pre-transition UHF channel 18 to VHF channel 6.

Translators
KHGI/KWNB repeats its programming on two translator stations: KHGI-CD rebroadcasts KHGI-TV, while KWNB-LD directly repeats KWNB. All three of these stations are owned by Sinclair.

Active translators

Former translators

References

External links

ABC network affiliates
TBD (TV network) affiliates
Sinclair Broadcast Group
Television channels and stations established in 1953
1953 establishments in Nebraska
HGI-TV